Million Manhoef (born 3 January 2002) is a Dutch professional footballer who plays as a defender for Eredivisie club Vitesse. He is the son of Melvin Manhoef.

International career
Born in the Netherlands, Manhoef is of Surinamese descent. He is a youth international for the Netherlands.

References

External links

 Career stats & Profile - Voetbal International

2002 births
Living people
People from Beemster
Dutch footballers
Netherlands youth international footballers
Dutch sportspeople of Surinamese descent
Association football defenders
SBV Vitesse players
Eredivisie players
Footballers from North Holland